Horomona Pohio (1815–1880) was a New Zealand Māori leader, missionary, assessor and land protester. Of Māori descent, he identified with the Ngāi Tahu iwi, the main tribe in South New Zealand. He was born in Wainono, South Canterbury, New Zealand in 1815.

References

1815 births
1880 deaths
Ngāi Tahu people
People from South Canterbury
Māori activists